Arthrostylidium haitiense is a species of Arthrostylidium bamboo in the grass family. The species is native to Central America, the West Indies, northern South America, and southern Mexico.

References 

haitiense
Plants described in 1907